Casanayda! (English: Casa Is Rocking!, French: Casa ça bouge!) is a 2007 documentary film directed by Farida Belyazid and Abderrahim Mettour. It was screened at multiple national and international festivals.

Synopsis 
Casanayda! follows young actors representative of the burgeoning Moroccan artistic and cultural scene in their successes as well as in their struggles.

References 

2007 documentary films
2000s Arabic-language films
2000s French-language films
Moroccan documentary films
2007 multilingual films
Moroccan multilingual films